Equi, genitive singular and nominative plural of Latin word "equus" meaning horse, may also refer to:

Aequi, an ancient people of central Italy

People
 Elaine Equi (born 1953), an American poet
 Marie Equi (1872–1952), an American medical doctor and anarchist

Places
 Equi Terme, part of the Italian comune Fivizzano, in the province of Massa and Carrara, in Tuscany

See also

 Equis (disambiguation)
 Equus (disambiguation)
S. equi (disambiguation)